Hellas Planitia  is a plain located within the huge, roughly circular impact basin Hellas located in the southern hemisphere of the planet Mars. Hellas is the third- or fourth-largest known impact crater in the Solar System. It is centered at  Hellas Planitia spans the boundary between the Hellas quadrangle and the Noachis quadrangle.

Description
Hellas Planitia is thought to have been formed during the Late Heavy Bombardment period of the Solar System, approximately 4.1 to 3.8 billion years ago, when a protoplanet or large asteroid hit the surface.

This is 103% higher than the pressure at the topographical datum (610 Pa, or 6.1 mbar, or 0.09 psi) and above the triple point of water, suggesting that the liquid phase could be present under certain conditions of temperature, pressure, and dissolved salt content. It has been theorized that a combination of glacial action and explosive boiling may be responsible for gully features in the crater.

Some of the low elevation outflow channels extend into Hellas from the volcanic Hadriacus Mons complex to the northeast, two of which Mars Orbiter Camera images show contain gullies: Dao Vallis and Reull Vallis. These gullies are also low enough for liquid water to be transient around Martian noon, if the temperature were to rise above 0 Celsius.

Hellas Planitia is antipodal to Alba Patera. It and the somewhat smaller Isidis Planitia together are roughly antipodal to the Tharsis Bulge, with its enormous shield volcanoes, while Argyre Planitia is roughly antipodal to Elysium, the other major uplifted region of shield volcanoes on Mars. Whether the shield volcanoes were caused by antipodal impacts like that which produced Hellas, or if it is mere coincidence, is unknown.

Discovery and naming
Due to its size and its light coloring, which contrasts with the rest of the planet, Hellas Planitia was one of the first Martian features discovered from Earth by telescope. Before Giovanni Schiaparelli gave it the name Hellas (which in Greek means Greece), it was known as Lockyer Land, having been named by Richard Anthony Proctor in 1867 in honor of Sir Joseph Norman Lockyer, an English astronomer who, using a  refractor, produced "the first really truthful representation of the planet" (in the estimation of E. M. Antoniadi).

Possible glaciers

Radar images by the Mars Reconnaissance Orbiter (MRO) spacecraft's SHARAD radar sounder suggest that features called lobate debris aprons in three craters in the eastern region of Hellas Planitia are actually glaciers of water ice lying buried beneath layers of dirt and rock. Scientists believe that snow and ice accumulated on higher topography, flowed downhill, and is now protected from sublimation by a layer of rock debris and dust. Furrows and ridges on the surface were caused by deforming ice.

Also, the shapes of many features in Hellas Planitia and other parts of Mars are strongly suggestive of glaciers, as the surface looks as if movement has taken place.

Honeycomb terrain
These relatively flat-lying "cells" appear to have concentric layers or bands, similar to a honeycomb. This honeycomb terrain was first discovered in the northwestern part of Hellas. The geologic process responsible for creating these features remains unresolved. Some calculations indicate that this formation may have been caused by ice moving up through the ground in this region. The ice layer would have been between 100 m and 1 km thick. When one substance moves up through another denser substance, it is called a diapir. So, it seems that large masses of ice have pushed up layers of rock into domes that were subsequently eroded. After erosion removed the top of the layered domes, circular features remained.

Layers

Interactive Mars map

In popular culture 
 Hellas Basin was a primary location in the 2017 video game Destiny 2. The location is part of the second game's Warmind downloadable content.
 It is also featured as a main location in the 2016 Bethesda video game reboot Doom.
In Planet-Size X-Men #1, the X-Men terraform Mars, turning the basin into Lake Hellas and building the Lake Hellas Diplomatic Ring, where galactic ambassadors can meet within the Sol system.

See also

 Argyre Planitia
 Atmosphere of Mars e.g. pressure at floor of Hellas Planitia
 Dune
 Gale crater
 Geography of Mars
 Glaciers on Mars
 Groundwater on Mars
 List of plains on Mars
 Water on Mars

Notes

References

Further reading

External links

 
  – centered on Hellas
 
 

Hellas quadrangle

Noachis quadrangle
Plains on Mars